Eugene F. McDonald (1886–1958) founded Zenith Radio in 1921, a major American radio and electronics manufacturer for most of the twentieth century.

Early life

Eugene F. McDonald Jr. was born March 11, 1886, in Syracuse, New York, the son of Frazier McDonald and Betty May Thompson McDonald. He earned his first money while a schoolboy by reading electric meters. School did not appeal to McDonald, and at the end of his sophomore year in high school he left school to take a factory job with the Franklin Automobile Company.

Moving to Chicago in 1904, he became an automobile salesman with the Franklin Auto Company and, as a publicity stunt, once drove a car up the steps of the General John Logan Memorial in Grant Park—with a photographer present and a policeman there to arrest him.  He paid the policeman $10 for the arrest.  In 1904, he began working for the company in Syracuse. He quickly rose in the sales and promotion areas and made a name for himself. In 1910, he moved back to Chicago to join a speculative business of a friend of his who wished to manufacture an automobile self-starter. The business did not succeed and McDonald lost his investment.

In 1911, he was in partnership in Detroit selling used cars, and by the end of 1912 had begun a credit finance company for the purchase of new and used cars, a commodity that had previously not been available on credit. He was the first to offer working people a payment plan for the purchase of an automobile.

Military service

When the United States entered World War I in 1917, he enlisted in the Naval intelligence service and eventually became a lieutenant commander. His commission came about as he understood the operation a device used in the Navy for recording radio and telephone conversations – the "telegraphone" – and the manufacturer was no longer in business. He remained in the service until 1919 but continued service in the Naval Reserve until 1939.  He kept the title of lieutenant commander for the rest of his life, having retired at the rank from the USNR.

Founding of Zenith Radio Corporation

He joined with Ralph Matthews and Karl Hassel, the three of them incorporating the Zenith Corporation (formerly Chicago Radio Labs) in 1923. From the call letters of their amateur station, 9ZN, they developed the trade name of ZN-th. The company survived the Great Depression and was soon the leader of radio manufacturers. At the same time McDonald launched a career as an explorer and adventurer that publicized the Zenith products and sent sales to new records.

He formed and was the first president of the National Association of Broadcasters and pioneered the development of the short-wave radio. When Donald B. MacMillan made his Arctic trip he was equipped with transmitters and receivers supplied by the Zenith Corporation. "He expanded the radio medium into international communications, ship-to-shore, radar, and VHF and UHF television."  The company slogan was: "The quality goes in before the name goes on."

The Zenith Corporation was a great company and a good example to others. During the Great Depression, Zenith employees took less pay and worked longer hours to keep the company alive. As the economy improved, Comdr. McDonald rewarded them with additional shares in the company and a larger portion of its profits.

He became interested in the radio business in 1920 upon learning that there was money to be made in it. However, it was necessary to hold a manufacturing license from Edwin Armstrong - and issuance of these had been suspended indefinitely. However, in 1921 he entered into a partnership with the founders of the Chicago Radio Laboratory, Karl Hassel, and Ralph Matthews. Under the tradename "Z-nith", this company held a valuable Armstrong license but lacked funds for expansion to meet the demands of their order book.

McDonald was appointed general manager and the partnership was formally incorporated in 1923 as the Zenith Radio Corporation. By 1927, the company was large enough to secure its own RCA manufacturing license. McDonald was well known for his charismatic leadership style, and his unexpected death in 1958 reportedly "left a void of talent at the top" of the company.

The Zenith Trans-Oceanic 
Brief summary

 
Eugene McDonald, besides being a hard-driving and demanding CEO, was also a yachtsman. His yacht the Mizpah (AKA USS Mizpah (PY-29)) was one of the largest in the Great Lakes region. Toward the end of 1939 the interest in the war in Europe increased. McDonald had poor reception of any regional broadcast aboard the Mizpah and suggested that a portable radio be produced that could receive not only standard broadcast (AM radio) but higher-frequency shortwave broadcast to receive international broadcasts that use radio frequencies that could bounce off the Earth's ionosphere (upper atmosphere) and travel great distances.

One of the big obstacles to such a radio was that vacuum tubes in the 1930s and 1940s had trouble operating at higher frequencies using battery power supplies which were lower voltage than AC-operated designs. In late 1941 after many rejects by McDonald (who personally did the testing on his yacht). Zenith Radio engineers Gustaffson, Passow, Striker and Emde came up with the model 7G605 "Clipper", that was met with approval by McDonald after stringent testing. Zenith advertised this new product extensively, including loaning or giving one to a celebrity or well-known individual to try and evaluate. Zenith made electronics and radio history by producing the first totally portable multiband radio designed for standard and shortwave broadcast listening. Zenith went into production in 1942, but the US entry into World War II put a production halt to the "Clipper". Although no new consumer Trans-Oceanics were made, Zenith provided them for the war effort and continued to advertise and promote the Trans-Oceanic during World War II. Very few were produced (35,000), and not very many are in service presently, which makes this a very rare item.

In December 1957, Eugene McDonald and Zenith engineers put Zenith Radio back into the news with the world's first portable transistorized multiband radio, the Royal 1000 Trans-Oceanic. McDonald was personally involved with its conception and manufacture, as he was in the development of the 7G605 "Clipper"  The Royal 1000 like the "Clipper" was designed for standard and shortwave broadcast reception. The quality construction and engineering design efforts, a Zenith trademark were mechanically and electronically demonstrated in this model. This was McDonald's last major involvement with Zenith as he died the following year.

The Trans-Oceanic is considered by many the best-designed mass-produced portable radio made. Zenith for the most part, until the end of the model line, used the latest cost-effective technology advances and materials in Trans-Oceanics. The Trans-Oceanic model line ran from 1942 to 1982. For years it was the top selling "high-end" portable multiband radio until it was finally eclipsed by Sony with their digital tuning ICF-2001 and ICF2010 in the 1980s, which put the Trans-Oceanic out of business.

Zenith introduces the television remote control 

RCA's promoting radio manufacturers to build televisions with its no royalty policy got Zenith Radio into the TV business during the end of the 1940s. McDonald, whose aversion to commercials was well-known, wanted Zenith to produce and sell a remote control.

In 1950 Zenith came up with a remote control called the "Lazy Bones" which was connected with wires to the TV set. The next development was the "Flashmatic" (1955), designed by Eugene Polley, a wireless remote control that used a light beam to signal the TV (with a photosensitive pickup device) to change stations. One problem was that during the daytime the sensitivity degraded. In 1956 Zenith began producing a remote control named after McDonald's nickname "The Commander" and calling it the "Space Command". This new technology worked by sending an ultrasonic tone to the TV set, where it was picked up with a miniature microphone sensitive to only that tone. At the cost of $259.95, it was truly a luxury item.

Public notices of family life 

McDonald married the former Inez Riddle but they divorced in 1947. In 1962, four years after the commander's death, his former wife Inez Riddle McDonald Neale sought to have the divorce set aside. There was a long and ugly trial played out in the local newspapers. The children sided with the mother but she was finally denied her request. The McDonald  estate was estimated to be worth $30 million, but there were also lower estimates. Details of the decision were (McDonald v Neale) filed in 1962. It was ruled against claims his former wife petitioned for. The Illinois court ruling can be seen at this link McDonald Jr vs Neale.

There were two children born to the marriage: daughter Jean Marianne and son Eugene McDonald III.  The son was known as "Stormy"  died from a self-inflicted gunshot wound on February 6, 1965.  His body was brought back to Chicago from Arizona, where a funeral service was conducted. Prior to his death he was briefly married to Virginia Baker. For details transcribed from the Arizona Daily Star newspaper go to the link The Stormy McDonald Mystery. Another article written a year later (February 13, 1966) from the Reading Eagle newspaper with photos of Eugene McDonald III and his mother Inez Riddle McDonald Neale can be seen at this link The Boy Who Had Everything.

References

External links
 Rethford, Wayne. Scots, Great and Small

1886 births
1958 deaths
Radio pioneers
United States Navy officers
Businesspeople from Syracuse, New York
History of radio
Radio electronics
20th-century American businesspeople